Pearl Peters (born 30 March 1915 – died 19 June 1987 as පර්ල් වාසුදේවි) [Sinhala]), popularly as Pearl Vasudevi, was an actress in Sri Lankan cinema as well as a singer.

Personal life
Vasudevi was born as Pearl Peters in Galle on March 30, 1915 to a Burgher family. She studied at the Good Shepherd Convent, Colombo and became interested in theater at a young age.

She was married to fellow actor Eddie Junior. The couple has one daughter, Sujeewa Lalee. Sujeewa also acted in few films including maiden acting in Sithijaya. Vasudevi died 19 June 1987 at the age of 72 following a brief illness.

Career
Vasudevi made her debut as an actress in 1930 playing the role of a princess in the play Aparikshakari Nadu Theenduwa at the age of 15. With her fluency in English, she also secured a leading role in an adaption of Merchant of Venice. Vasudevi joined Eddie Master's troupe shortly after acting in the role of Seetha in Ramayanaya. The dramatist's son Eddie Junior composed the music for the play. Through their work together, Pearl and Eddie Junior would fall in love and got married in 1940. She also served as a Radio Ceylon singer at Sri Lanka Broadcasting Corporation (SLBC).

Vasudevi made her film debut with husband Eddie Junior in Sirisena Wimalaweera's 1949 movie Amma. She would subsequently appear in over 150 films including Sithijaya with her daughter Sujeewa Lalee.

Filmography

References

External links
Pearl Vasudevi's Biography in Sinhala Cinema Database

1915 births
1987 deaths
Sri Lankan film actresses
People from Galle
20th-century Sri Lankan actresses